Damien Touzé (born 7 July 1996) is a French cyclist, who currently rides for UCI WorldTeam . Touzé turned professional in 2019, and was named in the startlist for the 2019 Vuelta a España.

Major results

2013
 4th Road race, UEC European Junior Road Championships
 4th Paris–Roubaix Juniors
2014
 5th Paris–Roubaix Juniors
 9th Overall Tour de l'Abitibi
1st Stage 4
 10th Road race, UEC European Junior Road Championships
2017
 3rd Road race, National Under-23 Road Championships
 6th Road race, UCI Under-23 Road World Championships
 7th Paris–Troyes
 8th Grand Prix de Denain
 8th Paris–Camembert
 8th Tro-Bro Léon
 8th La Roue Tourangelle
 9th Grand Prix de la Somme
2018
 1st  Overall Kreiz Breizh Elites
1st  Points classification
1st  Young rider classification
1st Stage 1
 Tour de l'Avenir
1st  Points classification
1st Stage 3
 3rd Paris–Troyes
 4th Classic Loire Atlantique
 5th Paris–Camembert
 6th Overall Ronde de l'Oise
1st Stage 2
 8th Ronde van Vlaanderen Beloften
 10th Paris–Bourges
2019
 3rd Road race, National Road Championships
 3rd Polynormande
 8th Binche–Chimay–Binche
2020
 7th Overall Étoile de Bessèges
 7th Grand Prix La Marseillaise
2021
 3rd Road race, National Road Championships
 10th Tour du Finistère
2022
 9th Paris–Camembert
2023
 10th Classic Loire Atlantique

Grand Tour general classification results timeline

References

External links

1996 births
Living people
French male cyclists
European Games competitors for France
Cyclists at the 2019 European Games
Sportspeople from Eure
Cyclists from Normandy